VfL Sportfreunde Lotte is a German association football club from Lotte, North Rhine-Westphalia. The football team is part of a sports club with approximately 1400 members and departments for handball, walking, gymnastics, and swimming, as well as other activities.

History
The association was established as the gymnastics club Turnverein Lotte in 1929. After World War II the club was re-established as VfL Sportfreunde Lotte on 9 February 1946 and was built around football and handball departments.

Lotte reached the Verbandsliga Westfalen (V) in 1996 and after a title there in 2004 were promoted to the Oberliga Westfalen (IV), later Regionalliga West. They won that league in 2012–13 but lost the promotion play-off to RB Leipzig. In 2013–14, the club finished in second place. They won the Regionalliga West once more in 2015–16 and, after defeating Waldhof Mannheim in the play-off, earned promotion to the 3. Liga for the first time. On 18 May 2019, they were relegated back to the Regionalliga.

Sportfreunde plays their home matches in the Frimo Stadion (formerly the Sportpark am Lotter Kreuz) which holds 10,059 spectators.

Honours
The club's honours:
 Regionalliga West
 Champions: 2013, 2016
 Verbandsliga Westfalen
 Champions: 2004
 Landesliga Westfalen
 Champions: 1996
 Bezirksliga Westfalen
 Champions: 1989
 Westphalia Cup
 Winners: 2015

Players

Current squad

Out on loan

Notable coaches
 Manfred Wölpper (2008)
 Maik Walpurgis (2008–2013)

References

External links

Das deutsche Fußball-Archiv historical German football league tables (in German)
Racism accusations against SF Lotte players

 
Football clubs in Germany
Football clubs in North Rhine-Westphalia
Association football clubs established in 1929
1929 establishments in Germany
Steinfurt (district)
3. Liga clubs